Ladysmith is an unincorporated community in Caroline County, in the U.S. state of Virginia. The community contains attractions such as the Pendleton Golf Club, which is addressed as being in Ruther Glen.

History
A post office called Ladysmith has been in operation since 1928. The community may have been named after Ladysmith, in South Africa. A more likely scenario is that the community was given the name of Clara Smith‘s mother, original owner of the site.

Notable people
 William Clark (born 1770 in Ladysmith), explorer and politician

References

Unincorporated communities in Virginia
Unincorporated communities in Caroline County, Virginia